Brian Clewer (April 24, 1928 – April 16, 2008) was the radio host of "Cynic's Choice" a program of British comedy and British music that aired in Los Angeles for over 40 years.

References

External links
 

1928 births
2008 deaths
American radio personalities
Burials at Forest Lawn Memorial Park (Glendale)